William Bridgeman may refer to:
 William Bridgeman, 1st Viscount Bridgeman (1864–1935), British Conservative politician
William Bridgeman (MP for Bramber) (c. 1646–1699), English civil servant and MP
Bill Bridgeman (1916–1968), American test pilot
Billy Bridgeman (1884–1947), English footballer